Solo Live 2004 (Live at "Studio F") is a recording by jazz pianist Toshiko Akiyoshi, released in 2009 on the Studio Songs record label in Japan.

Track listing
"Long Yellow Road" (Akiyoshi) – 5:21
"Day Dream" (Strayhorn, Ellington, La Touche) – 7:02
"After You've Gone" (Layton, Creamer) – 4:04
"Kanchororin Bushi" aka "Children in the Temple Ground" (traditional) – 6:17
"Deep River" (traditional) – 5:08
"When You Wish upon a Star" (Harline, Washington) – 4:44
"Central Park West" (Coltrane) – 6:08
"'Round About Midnight" (Monk) – 6:35
"Hope" (Akiyoshi) – 3:48
"Tico Tico" (de Abreu) – 3:05

Personnel
Toshiko Akiyoshi – piano

References
Studio Songs YZSO-10001

Toshiko Akiyoshi albums
Solo piano jazz albums
2009 albums